Jack Benjamin Simpson (born 18 December 1996) is an English professional footballer who plays as a defender for Cardiff City. He has previously played for AFC Bournemouth and Rangers.

Club career

AFC Bournemouth
Simpson joined AFC Bournemouth at the age of twelve and signed his first professional contract in April 2015. Following this, he had a brief loan spell at non-League club AFC Totton during the early stages of the 2015–16 campaign before returning to Bournemouth and appearing as a substitute in their FA Cup fourth round tie against Portsmouth.

Almost two years after first appearing in a Bournemouth matchday squad, Simpson made his first-team debut in an EFL Cup tie against Middlesbrough, scoring the opening goal in their 3–1 victory. Following his debut, Simpson went onto feature in Bournemouth's quarter-final tie against Premier League champions Chelsea, playing for the full 90 minutes in their 2–1 defeat.

Rangers
On 28 January 2021, Simpson signed a pre-contract agreement to join Scottish Premiership club Rangers following the expiry of his Bournemouth contract at the end of the 2020–21 season. A deal was then made with Bournemouth that allowed Simpson to move permanently on 1 February 2021. He made his debut for Rangers in a Scottish Premiership match against Dundee United on 21 February 2021, coming for Filip Helander as a 67th minute substitute.

Cardiff City
Simpson moved to Cardiff City for an undisclosed transfer fee in August 2022.

International career
Simpson was part of the England national team youth sides during the early part of his career and made an appearance for the under-21 side in November 2018. He played the full ninety minutes in defence, during a 5–1 away win against Denmark under-21s.

Career statistics

Honours
Rangers
Scottish Premiership: 2020–21

References

External links

1996 births
Living people
Sportspeople from Weymouth
Footballers from Dorset
English footballers
Association football defenders
AFC Bournemouth players
A.F.C. Totton players
Premier League players
Southern Football League players
English Football League players
Rangers F.C. players
England under-21 international footballers
England youth international footballers
Scottish Professional Football League players
Cardiff City F.C. players